HSG may refer to:

 BNR class HSG, a class of locomotives
 Handling stolen goods
 Haringey Solidarity Group
 Hathersage railway station, England
 Hawker Siddeley Group, a former British aircraft manufacturer
 Hesnes Air, a Norwegian airline
 High School for the Gifted, in Ho Chi Minh City, Vietnam
 High Sierra Group, the creators of the High Sierra Format CD-ROM filesystem
 High-speed grinding, a method of maintaining railway track
 Hira Singh railway station, in Pakistan
 Hysterosalpingography, using X-rays to find the shape of the uterus and fallopian tubes
 Saga Airport, in Japan
 University of St. Gallen, in Switzerland